Douglas (Doug) Levin is an American businessman, technologist, and serial entrepreneur. He is the sole founder and first CEO of Black Duck Software.

Levin identified that developers’ use of open source code in commercial products created code management and license compliance concerns among enterprises. In addition, he recognized early on the application security risks associated with open source software. He started and built Black Duck to address those issues. Today, the company’s products are standard for open source software security, software development and management – a mandatory check box for most app dev projects and software.
Levin founded or co-founded six other companies, and holds four software patents.

After leaving Black Duck he served as a strategy partner for a management consulting firm specializing in providing C-level expertise to early-stage technology companies on an on-demand basis.

Today Levin serves as an advisor and has provided seed investment to an array of young companies in the cybersecurity and AI/machine learning segments, including Storm Forge(aka Carbon Relay).  He also is a frequent guest lecturer at the MIT Sloan School of Management and the Harvard Business School where he speaks on a range of topics, including finance, technology and markets, and entrepreneurship. Currently, he is co-teaching Startup Academy: 100 Essential Startup Questions  as part of HBS Digital Initiative.

Career

Early Years
Levin began his career as a product evangelist at Microsoft, working on the initial launch and subsequent releases of Microsoft Excel, and other initiatives from 1987 to 1995. He was a key member of the team that created Microsoft’s first volume licensing program, which was eventually extended to all the regions and countries in which the company did business. In his last role for the company, Levin ran Microsoft Germany’s corporate sales and marketing operations.

More Start-Ups
He then served as CEO of MessageMachines (acquired by NMS Communications in 2002) and X-Collaboration Software Corporation (acquired by Progress Software in 2000), two VC-backed companies based in Boston. He also helped found and fund Lucid Imagination, which became Lucid Works, and subsequently served on the company’s boards of directors and advisors. In January 2010, he founded Ayeah Games.

Education and awards
Levin has an advanced degree in International Economics from the Collège d'Europe in Bruges, Belgium and a BA from the University of North Carolina at Chapel Hill.. He has also attended Columbia University, New York University and the Massachusetts Institute of Technology (MIT) where he took computer science, accounting and finance coursework.. In 2007, Levin was awarded CEO of the Year by the Mass Technology Leadership Council. In 2009, he was named a fellow at New England Clean Energy Foundation.

Personal
Levin has two children and lives in Boston with his wife, Susana.

References

Year of birth missing (living people)
Living people
American computer businesspeople
Businesspeople from New York City
University of North Carolina at Chapel Hill alumni
College of Europe alumni
American technology chief executives